Sambal Wangma (English: Beyond The Fence) is a 1993 Indian Meitei language film directed by K. Ibohal Sharma and produced by Ph. Sobita Devi. The story of the film was written by Ph. Sobita Devi and screenplay by K. Ibohal Sharma. It stars Khun Joykumar, Parvati and Star Kamei in the lead roles. A. Bimola and Khun Joykumar are playback singers of the songs in the movie. The film won the National Film Award for Best Feature Film in Manipuri at the 41st National Film Awards. It was also selected for Indian Panorama of the International Film Festival of India 1994.

Synopsis
The film vocally speaks about social taboo with respect to marriage between close relatives and how such persons have been ostracised from the community. It also shows the different social set up of the Kabui and the Tangkhul communities inhabiting in the hills of Manipur.

Cast
 Khun Joykumar
 Parvati
 Star Kamei
 K. Jiten Sharma
 Ranibala
 Lamaru Kamei
 Tamphamani
 Jelu Kamei
 Bina
 Nilamai Sharma
 Hamom Sadananda

Accolades
The film won the Best Feature Film in Manipuri Award at the 41st National Film Awards. The citation for the award reads, "For correlating the integration of Man with Nature for the development of the human personality."

References

Meitei-language films
1993 films